Vincent Ingala (born December 10, 1992) is a contemporary/urban jazz multi-instrumentalist. The tenor saxophone is his main instrument of choice, though he plays drums, guitar, piano, and sings as well. He has released seven albums, his most recent being released on September 17, 2021.

Biography

Ingala was born in Prospect, Connecticut, to parents Leo and Dawn Ingala. At age four, he started playing the drums when his parents bought him a drum set for Christmas. As he got older he learned to play the guitar, the piano, and later the saxophone at age 10. He is self taught on all instruments. As a teenager, he played the local restaurant and club circuit. His father was a mobile disc jockey, which introduced Vincent to many different styles of music, including 50s rock ’n’ roll, soul, funk, R&B, and also smooth jazz.

His debut album North End Soul, released in 2010, featured smooth jazz and R&B tracks played on the saxophone, guitar, and piano. At seventeen years old, Ingala did the recording, composing, and producing for the album. The song "It Is What It Is" peaked at No. 14 on Billboard's Smooth Jazz Songs.

Ingala's second album Can't Stop Now, released in 2012, features keyboardist Gregg Karukas and pianist Jonathan Fritzén. He wrote or co-wrote seven of the album's tracks, and programmed and composed the album. Can't Stop Now peaked at No. 28 on the Billboard Jazz Albums. It also reached No. 15 on SmoothJazz.com's Year End 2014 Top 50 Albums, and had five songs place in the top 10 on Billboard's Smooth Jazz Songs, including "Wish I Was There" at No. 1.

His third album, Coast to Coast, was released in 2015. The album name reflects his move from the east coast (Connecticut) to the west coast (Long Beach, California). Ingala did the programming, composing, producing, and vocals for the album. The album peaked at No. 12 on the Billboard Jazz Albums, and placed at No. 5 on the SmoothJazz.com's 2015 Top 50 Year End Chart. "When I'm With You" and "Coast To Coast" both peaked at No. 1 on Billboard's Smooth Jazz Songs.

His fourth album was Christmas, released in 2016. Guest artists on the album include Ariana Savalas, Steve Oliver, and Justin Shandor. It features smooth jazz renditions of several Christmas songs played on the saxophone, piano, and guitar. Ingala performs the majority of the vocals.

In 2018, Ingala departed from being an independent artist and signed with record label Shanachie, releasing Personal Touch. Ingala performed all instruments for all 10 tracks on the album, and wrote all but two of them. The song “Snap, Crackle, Pop” went to No. 1 on the Billboard Smooth Jazz chart for five weeks. 

Ingala has performed throughout the USA and in several countries, including the United Kingdom, Mexico, Indonesia, Italy, Portugal, Spain, Sweden, and Africa. He has recorded and performed with numerous other instrumental artists such as Peter White, Dave Koz, Mindi Abair, Kirk Whalum, Rick Braun, David Benoit, Keiko Matsui, Earl Klugh, Paul Taylor, Steve Oliver, Michael Lington, Gregg Karukas, Jonathan Fritzen, and Chris Geith.

Discography

References

External links 

Vincent Ingala on AllMusic
Vincent Ingala on CDBaby

Smooth jazz saxophonists
American jazz saxophonists
American male saxophonists
1992 births
Living people
People from Prospect, Connecticut
American people of Italian descent
21st-century American saxophonists
Jazz musicians from Connecticut
21st-century American male musicians
American male jazz musicians